The 2010 Türk Telecom İzmir Cup was a professional tennis tournament played on outdoor hard courts. It was part of the 2010 ATP Challenger Tour. It took place in İzmir, Turkey between September 20 and 26, 2010.

Entrants

Seeds

 Rankings are as of September 13, 2010.

Other entrants
The following players received wildcards into the singles main draw:
  George Bastl
  Samuel Groth
  Haluk Akkoyun
  Tuna Altuna

The following players received entry from the qualifying draw:
  Theodoros Angelinos
  Marin Bradarić
  Mikhail Elgin
  Sadik Kadir (as a Lucky loser)
  Artem Smirnov

Champions

Singles

 Somdev Devvarman def.  Marsel İlhan, 6–4, 6–3

Doubles

 Rameez Junaid /  Frank Moser def.  Jamie Delgado /  Jonathan Marray, 6–2, 6–4

External links
2010 Draws
Official website
ITF search